Amaka is a Nigerian given name. Notable people with the name include:

 Amaka Agugua-Hamilton (born 1983), American basketball coach
 Amaka Gessler (born 1990), New Zealand swimmer
 Amaka Igwe (1963–2014), Nigerian filmmaker and broadcasting executive
 Amaka Ogoegbunam (born 1990), Nigerian sprinter
 Amaka Osakwe (born 1987), Nigerian fashion designer

See also
 Christ the King College, Onitsha, popularly known as Amaka Boys, aan all-boys secondary school in Onitsha, Anambra, Nigeria